This is a '''list of Charlotte 49ers football players in the NFL draft.

Key

Selections

References

Charlotte

Charlotte 49ers NFL Draft